Jagdszenen aus Niederbayern is a 1965 play by Martin Sperr. The play was adapted into a film of the same name in 1969.

See also
 Hunting Scenes from Bavaria

References
 

1965 plays
LGBT-related plays
Plays set in Germany
German plays adapted into films
Bavaria in fiction